Campbell is an unincorporated community in Clarke County, Alabama, United States.

History
Robert Beverley Jr.'s family moved here from Wadesboro, North Carolina due to harsh winter climate. They were lineal descendants of Thomas Rolfe (only child of John Rolfe and Pocahontas).

Geography

Notable person
 Bill Armistead, chairman of the Alabama Republican Party

References

Unincorporated communities in Clarke County, Alabama
Unincorporated communities in Alabama